The List of Boels–Dolmans Cycling Team riders contains riders from the UCI women's cycling team Boels–Dolmans Cycling Team. In 2010 the team existed under the name Dolmans Landscaping cycleteam, but was not an UCI women's team.

2021 SD Worx Cycling team

2020 Boels–Dolmans Cycling team

2019 Boels–Dolmans Cycling team

2018 Boels–Dolmans Cycling Team

2016 Boels–Dolmans Cycling Team

2015 Boels–Dolmans Cycling Team

As of 1 January 2015. Ages as of 1 January 2015.

2014 Boels–Dolmans Cycling Team

As of 1 March 2014. Ages as of 1 January 2014.

2013 Boels–Dolmans Cycling Team

As of 1 January 2013. Ages as of 1 January 2013.

2012 Dolmans-Boels Cycling Team

Ages as of 1 January 2012.

2011 Dolmans Landscaping Team

As of 1 January 2011. Ages as of 1 January 2011.

2010 Dolmans Landscaping cycleteam (non UCI)

The team was in this year not an 2010 UCI women's team.

  Daniëlle Bekkering
  Eyelien Bekkering
  Shanne Braspennincx
  Janneke Ensing
  Josephine Groenveld
  Sione Jongstra
  Nina Kessler
  Laura Meurs
  Agnes Ronner
  Winanda Spoor
  Debby van den Berg
  Kimberley van den Berg
  Marieke van Nek

See also

References

Lists of cyclists by team
Riders